Donald Alexander Noel McRae (25 December 1914 – 10 August 1986) was a double international sportsman, representing New Zealand in cricket and in soccer.  His last first-class match was in New Zealand's first Test match against Australia in 1946.

Cricket career
McRae played cricket for Canterbury from 1937–38 to 1945-46 as a tall, economical left-arm medium-pace bowler and useful lower-order batsman. In his first match, against Otago, he top-scored in the second innings with 43, which remained his highest first-class score. In 1943–44, playing for a New Zealand XI against a New Zealand Services XI, he opened the bowling and took 5 for 20 off 17 overs in the first innings. In his four inter-provincial matches in 1944-45 he took 17 wickets at 13.29, and was considered one of the best bowlers in New Zealand.

When the Plunket Shield resumed in 1945-46 he took 13 wickets in the three matches at 23.69. He took only one wicket when the Australians defeated Canterbury by an innings, but still made the Test side three weeks later. He opened the bowling and took 0 for 44 and made 0 and 8 in another innings defeat, and never played first-class cricket again.

Football career
McRae made a single appearance as goalkeeper for New Zealand in association football against Australia on 4 July 1936, conceding 7 goals in the 1–7 loss. His domestic club at the time was Nomads United.

See also
 One-Test wonder

References

External links

1914 births
1986 deaths
Canterbury cricketers
New Zealand Test cricketers
New Zealand cricketers
New Zealand association footballers
New Zealand international footballers
Association football goalkeepers
Association footballers from Christchurch
Cricketers from Christchurch